Oscar Frederick Nelson (November 5, 1881 – September 26, 1951) was a machinist's mate first class serving in the United States Navy who received the Medal of Honor for bravery.

Biography
For his actions he received the Medal January 5, 1906.

He was married to Anna D. Nelson. He died September 26, 1951, and is buried in Fort Snelling National Cemetery in Minneapolis, Minnesota.

Medal of Honor citation
Rank and organization: Machinist's Mate First Class, U.S. Navy. Born: 5 November 1881, Minneapolis, Minn. Accredited to: Minnesota. G.O. No.: 13, 5 January 1906.

Citation:

Serving on board the U.S.S. Bennington, for extraordinary heroism displayed at the time of the explosion of a boiler of that vessel at San Diego, Calif., 21 July 1905.

See also

List of Medal of Honor recipients during peacetime

References

External links

1881 births
1951 deaths
United States Navy Medal of Honor recipients
United States Navy sailors
Military personnel from Minneapolis
Burials in Minnesota
Non-combat recipients of the Medal of Honor